The Cracovia Marathon (Polish: Cracovia Maraton) is an annual marathon which has taken place every year in Kraków, Poland since its inception in 2002. It is one of Poland's largest marathons in terms of the number of finishers.

History 

The Cracovia Marathon was established in 2002 and has been run every year since. The marathon is held usually in May. The competition features professional athletes and amateur fun runners. A total of 3,200 people finished the race in 2011 while in 2013 a total of 4,415 participants finished the race, which made it the third largest such race in Poland after the Warsaw Marathon and the Poznań Marathon.

The marathon is one of five in the Crown of Polish Marathons program, along with the Dębno Marathon, Poznań Marathon, Warsaw Marathon, and Wrocław Marathon.

Since 2016, the Cracovia Marathon has been part of the Royal Running Triad (Polish: Królewska Triada Biegowa) alongside Cracovia Royal Half-Marathon and the Three Mounds Race.

The 2020 edition of the race was postponed to 2022 due to the coronavirus pandemic, with all entries automatically transferred to 2022 and all registrants given the option of obtaining a refund.

Winners 

Key:
 Course record

By country

Notes

See also 
Sport in Poland
Warsaw Marathon

References 

List of winners
Cracovia Marathon History . Cracovia Marathon. Retrieved on 2011-04-29.

External links 

Cracovia Marathon
Marathon Info

Recurring sporting events established in 2002
Marathons in Poland
Sports competitions in Kraków
Athletics competitions in Poland
2002 establishments in Poland
May sporting events
Spring (season) events in Poland